Froot is a 2015 album by Marina and the Diamonds.

Froot may also refer to:

"Froot" (song), title track of the Marina and the Diamonds album
Dan Froot, American saxophonist
 Froot (car), the front boot of a vehicle

See also
 Fruit
 Froot Loops
 F-root, one of the root name servers
 fRoots, a music magazine